Sergei Vladimirovich Natalushko (born 13 September 1960) is a former Russian professional footballer.

Club career
He made his professional debut in the Soviet Second League in 1988 for FC Tekstilshchik Kamyshin. He played three games in the UEFA Cup 1994–95 for FC Tekstilshchik Kamyshin.

References

1960 births
People from Krasnoyarsk Krai
Living people
Soviet footballers
Russian footballers
Association football forwards
Russian Premier League players
FC Tekstilshchik Kamyshin players
FC Saturn Ramenskoye players
FC Metallurg Lipetsk players
FC Neftekhimik Nizhnekamsk players
Sportspeople from Krasnoyarsk Krai